Marisa Alejandra Peguri (born 24 March 1976) is an Argentine former rower. She competed in the women's lightweight double sculls event at the 2000 Summer Olympics.

References

External links
 

1976 births
Living people
Argentine female rowers
Olympic rowers of Argentina
Rowers at the 2000 Summer Olympics
Sportspeople from Buenos Aires Province
Pan American Games medalists in rowing
Pan American Games gold medalists for Argentina
Rowers at the 1999 Pan American Games
Medalists at the 1999 Pan American Games
20th-century Argentine women